is a Japanese curler. She was born November 20, 1984 in Kushiro, Hokkaido, but grew up in Minamifurano, Hokkaido.

Career 
Moe Meguro won her first medal at the international level at the 2004 Pacific Curling Championships winning the gold medal. She played lead under skip Yumie Hayashi.

Team Aomori was selected to represent Japan at the 2006 Winter Olympics . At the Games she threw first under skip Ayumi Onodera.

At the 2006 Pacific Curling Championships in Tokyo, Moe Meguro skipped Team Aomori and won a bronze medal. She also won a bronze medal at the 2007 Winter Universiade and a silver medal at the 2007 Pacific Curling Championships finishing the tournament with an 8-1 record.

At the 2008 Ford World Women's Curling Championship, Meguro skipped the Japanese team to 4th place (one of Japan's best ever finishes, Japan also finished 4th in 1997). The team was one shot away from the gold medal final, but let Canada steal a point in the 10th and 11th ends of their semi-final game. In the bronze medal game, they lost to Switzerland, in a re-match of the 3 vs. 4 game which the Japanese had won.

Moe Meguro won the bronze medal at the 2008 Pacific Curling Championships and the silver medal in 2009, losing the final to China skipped by Wang Bingyu.

She was also skip for Team Japan at the 2010 Winter Olympics (finishing the round robin stage with a 3-6 record) and the 2010 Ford World Women's Curling Championship (finishing 11th with a disappointing 2-9 record).

She announced her retirement in June 2010.

Teammates 
2010 Vancouver Olympic Games
Kotomi Ishizaki, Lead
Mari Motohashi, Second
Anna Ohmiya, Third
Mayo Yamaura, Alternate

2006 Torino Olympic Games
Ayumi Onodera, Skip
Mari Motohashi, Second
Yumie Hayashi, Third
Sakurako Terada, Alternate

Grand Slam record 

Key
C - Champion
F - Lost final
SF - Lost semi final
QF - Lost quarter final
Q - Did not make playoffs
DNP - Did not participate in event
N/A - not a Grand Slam event that season

References 
 Team Aomori profile (in Japanese)
 Torino 2006 profile

Japanese female curlers
Living people
1984 births
People from Kushiro, Hokkaido
Sportspeople from Hokkaido
Curlers at the 2006 Winter Olympics
Curlers at the 2010 Winter Olympics
Olympic curlers of Japan
Universiade medalists in curling
Pacific-Asian curling champions
Universiade bronze medalists for Japan
Competitors at the 2007 Winter Universiade
Medalists at the 2007 Winter Universiade
20th-century Japanese women
21st-century Japanese women